Anita Strindberg (born 19 June 1937) is a Swedish former actress who appeared in numerous Italian giallo films in the 1970s.

Strindberg appeared as Anita Edberg in two Swedish films in the late 1950s. She started her career in gialli with Lucio Fulci's A Lizard in a Woman's Skin in 1971 and starred in her first lead role that same year, in the Sergio Martino-directed The Case of the Scorpion's Tail. In 1972, she starred in two more gialli: Aldo Lado's Who Saw Her Die? and Martino's Your Vice Is a Locked Room and Only I Have the Key. 

After the early 1970s, Strindberg acted in many types of genre films: a women in prison film Women in Cell Block 7 (1973); the Exorcist-like horror film The Antichrist (1974); and the poliziotteschi film Almost Human (1974), directed by Umberto Lenzi. Her last film was Riccardo Freda's Murder Obsession, also known as Fear co-starring Laura Gemser.

Filmography
Blonde in Bondage (1957) - Telephone Operator
Sköna Susanna och gubbarna (1959) - Susanna 
Quella chiara notte d'ottobre (1970) - Victim (uncredited)
Una lucertola con la pelle di donna (A Lizard in a Woman's Skin, 1971) - Julia Durer
La coda dello scorpione (Case of the Scorpion's Tail, 1971) - Cléo Dupont
Coartada en disco rojo (The Two Faces of Fear, 1972) - Dr. Paola Lombardi
The Eroticist (1972) - French Ambassador's Wife
Chi l'ha vista morire? (Who Saw Her Die?, 1972) - Elizabeth Serpieri
Il tuo vizio è una stanza chiusa e solo io ne ho la chiave (Your Vice Is a Locked Room and Only I Have the Key, 1972) - Irina
Forza 'G' (Winged Devils, 1972) - Cléo Dupont
Al tropico del cancro (Tropic of Cancer, 1972) - Grace Wright
Partirono preti, tornarono... curati (Halleluja to Vera Cruz, 1973)
Diario segreto da un carcere femminile (Women in Cell Block 7, 1973) - Daughter of Musumeci
Contratto carnale (The African Deal, 1974) - Eva McDougall
La profanazione (1974)
Milano odia: la polizia non può sparare (Almost Human, 1974) - Iona Tucci
L'uomo senza memoria (Puzzle, 1974) - Mary Caine
L'anticristo (The Antichrist, 1974) - Greta
La verginella (1975)
La segretaria privata di mio padre (1976) - Ingrid
L'inconveniente (1976)
The Salamander (1981) - Princess Faubiani
Murder Obsession (1981) - Glenda Stanford (final film role)

References

External links
 

1937 births
Living people
20th-century Swedish actresses